Maksim Yorevich Romaschenko (born 31 July 1976) is a professional football coach and a former player who played as a midfielder. Born in Ukraine, he made 64 appearances for the Belarus national team and is the country's record goalscorer with 20 goals. He works as a coach with the academy of Strogino Moscow.

Club career
Romaschenko played for Dnepr Mogilev, Poligraphtekhnika Oleksandria, Fandok Bobruisk, MPKC Mozyr, Gaziantepspor, Trabzonspor, Dynamo Moscow, Torpedo Moscow and Bursaspor.

Personal life
His older brother, Miroslav Romaschenko and his nephew Nikita Romaschenko (Miroslav's son) were both professional footballers as well.

Career statistics
Scores and results list Belarus goal tally first, score column indicates score after each Romaschenko goal.

Honours
MPKC Mozyr
 Belarusian Premier League: 1996
 Belarusian Cup: 1995–96

Trabzonspor
 Turkish Cup: 2003–04

Individual
Belarusian Footballer of the Year: 2004

References

Living people
1976 births
People from Pavlohrad
Association football midfielders
Ukrainian footballers
Ukrainian expatriate footballers
Expatriate footballers in Belarus
Belarusian footballers
Belarus international footballers
Belarusian expatriate footballers
Expatriate footballers in Russia
Expatriate footballers in Turkey
FC Dnepr Mogilev players
Belarusian Premier League players
FC Dynamo Moscow players
Russian Premier League players
Gaziantepspor footballers
Trabzonspor footballers
Bursaspor footballers
FC Torpedo Moscow players
Süper Lig players
FC Khimki players
FC Salyut Belgorod players
FC Dynamo Bryansk players
Belarusian people of Ukrainian descent
FC Oleksandriya players
FC Slavia Mozyr players
FC Fandok Bobruisk players
Sportspeople from Dnipropetrovsk Oblast